Tiergestalt is an East German documentary film about Berlin Zoological Garden and Leipzig Zoological Garden. It was released in 1950.

External links
 

1950 films
East German films
1950s German-language films
German black-and-white films
German documentary films
1950 documentary films
1950s German films